Bakesh-e Yek Rural District is a rural district (dehestan) in the Central District of Mamasani County, Fars Province, Iran. At the 2006 census, its population (including Khumeh Zar-e Olya and Khumeh Zar-e Sofla, which were subsequently detached from the rural district and promoted to city status under the name Khumeh Zar) was 17,107, in 3,771 families; excluding Khumeh Zar, the population (as of 2006) was 11,464, in 2,488 families.  The rural district has 70 villages.

References 

Rural Districts of Fars Province
Mamasani County